The 2016 Larry H. Miller Tour of Utah was the 13th edition of the Tour of Utah. It started on August 1 in Logan and finished on August 7 in Park City. It was rated as a 2.HC event on the UCI America Tour.

Teams 
The sixteen teams invited to participate in the Tour of Utah are:

Route

Stages

Stage 1

Stage 2

Stage 3

Stage 4

Stage 5

Stage 6

Stage 7

Classifications

References

External links 

2016
2016 UCI America Tour
2016 in American sports
2016 in sports in Utah
August 2016 sports events in the United States